The No-Conscription Fellowship was a British pacifist organization which was founded in London by Fenner Brockway and Clifford Allen on 27 November 1914, after the First World War had failed to reach an early conclusion.  Other prominent supporters included John Clifford, Bruce Glasier, Hope Squire, Bertrand Russell, Robert Smillie and Philip Snowden.

Background
A focus of the campaign was the Military Service Act which introduced conscription in 1916.  Branches were established across the country, leaflets were produced and deputations sent to lobby Parliament. They were successful in getting provision for conscientious objectors in the bill, but opposed the establishment of the army's Non-Combatant Corps.

History
The founders and other members were jailed for their opposition to conscription.  Bertrand Russell took over from Clifford Allen as the chairman of the organisation while Catherine Marshall took over from Fenner Brockway as secretary.  Marshall was in love with Clifford Allen and, when he was suffering from the effects of imprisonment, she drove herself to the point of exhaustion and Lilla Brockway then resumed the role of secretary in 1917, as she had been provisional secretary in 1916.  The National Committee in 1916 was A. Barratt Brown, Alfred Salter, Aylmer Rose, Bertrand Russell, C.H. Norman, Catherine Marshall, Clifford Allen, Edward Grubb, Fenner Brockway, John P. Fletcher, Morgan Jones, Rev. Leyton Richards, Will Chamberlain.

The Scottish organisation was led by Marjory Newbold, whose husband Walton became a Communist MP.

Branches were established across the country and the first national convention was held on 27 November 1915 at the Congregational Memorial Hall.  The second convention was held the following year on 8 April at Devonshire House — a Quaker meeting place in Bishopsgate.  Beatrice Webb, who was pro-war, recorded the occasion in her diary,

From March 1916 the NCF published The Tribunal. In an effort to suppress this publication, the police raided the National Labour Press and dismantled the printing press. However the NCF had a secret press and were able to continue publishing.

Historian Thomas Kennedy says that during the last two years of the war, the NCF remained a:
minor but troublesome irritant to the authorities, using its surprisingly resilient propaganda machinery to expose brutal or illegal treatment of conscientious objectors as well as to agitate,  especially among the industrial working classes, an end to the conflict.

See also
 List of anti-war organizations

References

Further reading
 

1914 establishments in England
Organizations established in 1914
Peace organisations based in the United Kingdom
Conscientious objection organizations
United Kingdom in World War I